Orwell Rolls in His Grave is a 2003 American documentary film directed by Robert Kane Pappas and written by Pappas and Tom Blackburn.

Documentary topic
The film covered topics including the Telecommunications Act of 1996, concentration of media ownership, political corruption, Federal Communications Commission (FCC), the controversy over the US presidential election of 2000 (particularly in Florida with Bush v. Gore), and the Carter vs. Reagan 1980 "October Surprise" conspiracy theory.

Participants
 Charles Lewis, Founder of the Center for Public Integrity
 Robert McChesney, Professor at University of Illinois at Urbana-Champaign
 Mark Crispin Miller, Author, Professor at New York University
 Bernie Sanders, Congressman from Vermont
 Danny Schechter, Author and Media Critic
 Vincent Bugliosi, Attorney and Author
 Jeff Cohen, Founder of FAIR
 Dennis Kucinich, former Congressman
 Mark Lloyd, Visiting Professor at M.I.T.
 Michael Moore, Journalist and Activist
 John Nichols, Journalist and Activist	
 Greg Palast, Journalist and Author
 Helen Thomas, Journalist and member of White House press corps

Screenings
The film has aired in October 2004, on Free Speech TV, a non-profit TV station based in Denver, Colorado and Link TV.

Reception
In 2004, Washington Post staff writer Desson Thomson found the documentary similar to Fahrenheit 9/11, The Corporation and Outfoxed: Rupert Murdoch's War on Journalism.

See also
 Manufacturing Consent: Noam Chomsky and the Media
 Spin
 The medium is the message
 Politico-media complex
 Propaganda model
 Carter vs. Reagan 1980 "October Surprise"

References

External links
 
  
 

2003 films
Documentary films about journalism
Documentary films about the media
Films about freedom of expression
Films based on works by George Orwell
Works about the information economy
2000s English-language films